Mbagnick Ndiaye (born 5 November 1993) is a Senegalese judoka. He represented Senegal at the 2019 African Games held in Rabat, Morocco and he won the gold medal in the men's +100 kg event. In the same year, he also won the gold medal in the men's +100 kg event at the 2019 African Judo Championships held in Cape Town, South Africa.

Career 

He has won several medals at the African Judo Championships.

In 2021, he competed in the men's +100 kg event at the Judo World Masters held in Doha, Qatar. At the 2021 African Judo Championships held in Dakar, Senegal, he won one of the bronze medals in his event. He also competed in the men's +100 kg event at the 2020 Summer Olympics held in Tokyo, Japan.

In 2022, he won one of the bronze medals in his event at the 2022 Judo Grand Prix Almada held in Almada, Portugal.

Achievements

References

External links 
 

Living people
1993 births
Place of birth missing (living people)
Senegalese male judoka
African Games medalists in judo
African Games gold medalists for Senegal
Competitors at the 2019 African Games
Judoka at the 2020 Summer Olympics
Olympic judoka of Senegal
20th-century Senegalese people
21st-century Senegalese people